The International Arthur Grumiaux Competition for Young Violinists is a violin competition held in Brussels, Belgium. First held in 2008 under the name of "Bravo", ii 2015 the competition was renamed in honour of the violinist Arthur Grumiaux. The competition takes place at the Royal Conservatory of Brussels in Belgium.

History
The competition was created in 2008 by Igor Tkatchouk, a violin professor at the Institut Supérieur de Musique et de Pédagogie in Namur, originally under the name of "Bravo!" competition. It took place each year at the Institut and since 2017 in the Royal Conservatoire in Brussels.  In 2015, the competition was supported by the foundation Baron Arthur Grumiaux and was renamed International Arthur Grumiaux Competition for Young Violinists. The same year, Princess Léa of Belgium rewarded the winners at the Royal Theater of Namur.
The competition is international and was represented in 2016 by 27 different nationalities

Since 2016 edition, Musiq'3 became the official partner of the project and in the same year, the Belgian TV news RTBF show a spot on television

Prize winners
There are four categories of prizes, based on the age of the performer: category A : through 10 years old, category B ages 11–13, category C ages 14–17, and category D ages 18–21.

Jury 2019

 Mr. Igor Tkatchouk – Belgium – President of the jury
 Mrs Dora Schwarzberg – Austria
 Mrs Shirly Laub – Belgium
 Mrs Tetiana Zolozova – France
 Mr. Roman Fedchuk – Czech Rep
 Mr. George Tudorache – Belgium
 Mr. Muhammedjan Turdiev – Turkey

Previous years

 Alexei Moshkov – Belgium (2012)
 Anna Sundin – Sweden (2013, 2014, 2015)
 Anne Léonardo – Belgium (2009)
 Dora Schwarzberg – Austria (2013 to 2019)
 Guido Jardon – Belgium (2008 à 2012)
 Jean-Frédéric Molard – Belgium (2010, 2011)
 Luba Aroutiounian – Belgium (2008)
 Michel Poskin – Belgium (2009)
 Muhammedjan Turdiev – Turkey (2014 to 2019)
 Nina Nazymova – France (2013)
 Philippe Descamps – Belgium (2011, 2012, 2013)
 Roman Fedchuk – Czech Republic (2009 to 2019)                    
 Saveliy Shalman – Russia (2009)
 Shirly Laub – Belgium (2010, 2012, 2016, 2017, 2019)
 Tatiana Samouil – Belgium (2008, 2012, 2013)
 Tetiana Zolozova – France (2013 à 2019)
 Ulysse Waterlot – Belgium (2010)
 Valery Oistrakh – Belgium (2011)
 Igor Tkatchouk – Belgium (Chairman 2008 to 2019)

References

External links
 

Violin competitions
Music competitions in Belgium
Events in Brussels
Belgian awards
Recurring events established in 2008
2008 establishments in Belgium